Calut (also, Calud and Dzhalut) is a village and municipality in the Oghuz Rayon of Azerbaijan.  It has a population of 918.

References 

Populated places in Oghuz District